Oncosperma fasciculatum is a species of flowering plant in the family Arecaceae. It is found only in Sri Lanka. It is threatened by habitat loss.

References

 http://www.palmtalk.org/forum/index.php?/topic/39996-oncosperma-fasciculatum-in-habitat/

fasciculatum
Endemic flora of Sri Lanka
Near threatened plants
Taxonomy articles created by Polbot